Świerzno  is a village in Kamień County, West Pomeranian Voivodeship, in north-western Poland. It is the seat of the gmina (administrative district) called Gmina Świerzno.

For the history of the region, see History of Pomerania.

The village has a population of 670.

Notable residents
 Ernst Ziemer (1911-1986), Wehrmacht officer

References

Villages in Kamień County